The National Trade Center is a skyscraper located in Xitun District, Taichung, Taiwan. As of December 2020, it is the 6th tallest building in Taichung and 24th tallest in Taiwan.

Design 
Designed by the international architectural firm Aedas, the shape of the building is like a spring bamboo shoot, which symbolises the prosperity of Taichung. Its streamline design is particularly unique among the settlements dominated by rectangular buildings in Xitun District.

See also 
 List of tallest buildings in Taiwan
 List of tallest buildings in Taichung

References

2018 establishments in Taiwan
Skyscraper office buildings in Taichung
Office buildings completed in 2018
Taichung's 7th Redevelopment Zone
Postmodern architecture in Taiwan